Llanite is a porphyritic rhyolite with distinctive phenocrysts of blue quartz (a rare quartz color) and perthitic feldspar (light grayish-orangish). The brown, fine-grained groundmass consists of very small quartz, feldspar, and biotite mica crystals.

Llanite comes from a hypabyssal porphyritic rhyolite dike that intrudes Precambrian metamorphics in the Llano Uplift of central Texas. Published radiometric dating on this llanite indicates that it's 1.106 billion years old (late Mesoproterozoic).

The quartz crystals found in llanite are blue hexagonal bipyramids. The unusual blue coloration of the quartz is thought to be due to ilmenite inclusions.

It is named after Llano County, Texas, the only place where it is found.

However, the geology of North-East Africa is very similar to that of Texas. Many of the minerals and fossils found are only found in these two locations on the whole planet.
(geologists have identified other locations where similar types of rock may be found). A dike of llanite crops out on Texas State Highway 16 approximately nine miles north of the town of Llano.

Llanite, which is similar to granite, is very strong, with a crushing strength of 37,800 lb/in2 or 26,577,180 kg/m2. Llanite is also very similar in appearance to pietersite.

Modal mineralogy of llanite:
quartz - 34.6% 
microcline - 27.8% 
plagioclase - 27.9% 
biotite - 8.6% 
fluorite - 1.1% 
apatite - 0.14% 
magnetite - trace 
ilmenite - trace 
zircon - trace

See also
Porphyry

References

External links

Heinrich, P. V., 2014, Llanite and the Blue Quartz of Texas. The Backbender's Gazette. vol. XLV, no. 5, pp. 5–12. (Houston Gem and Mineral Society, Houston, Texas).

Igneous rocks